Archerd is a surname. Notable people with the surname include:

Army Archerd (1922–2009), American columnist
Selma Archerd (born 1925), American actress, wife of Army
William Dale Archerd (1912–1977), American serial killer

See also
Archer (surname)